Warren Transmission was a General Motors automotive factory in Warren, Michigan that manufactured propulsion transmissions. It was located at 23500 Mound Road and opened in 1941 as a Navy ordnance plant, built and operated by the Hudson Motor Car Company, predecessor of American Motors Corporation.

As of 2006, the factory employed 1,200 people. The company announced on June 1, 2006 that it would spend $332 million to expand production at Warren. On April 5, 2010 GM announced it was adding 100 jobs to the Warren Transmission plant.

On May 31, 2017, Warren Transmission announced that the second shift would be eliminated starting June 26, 2017. On November 26, 2018, GM announced that the plant would be closed in 2019.

On March 20, 2020 GM announced that they would be producing face masks for to help protect workers in essential services across the country amidst the COVID-19 outbreak at the former Warren Transmission factory. On March 27, 2020, GM began production with first deliveries on April 8, 2020.

In December of 2021, GM would sell the  property to Northpoint Development for an undisclosed price. In January 2022, it was announced that the plant would be demolished and redeveloped.

Products 
 4T65-E Front wheel drive Hydra-Matic transmissions (Ended production Dec. 23, 2010)
 6T70/6T75 Front Wheel Drive/All Wheel Drive Hydra-Matic transmissions (Used by the Chevrolet Impala and Cadillac XTS)

References

External links

1941 establishments in Michigan
Warren, Michigan
General Motors factories
Motor vehicle assembly plants in Michigan
Buildings and structures in Macomb County, Michigan